Cornel Pavlovici (2 April 1942 – 8 January 2013) was a Romanian footballer who played as a striker.

Death
Pavlovici died on 8 January 2013.

Career statistics 
Total matches played in Romanian First League: 134 matches – 57 goals.
Topscorer of Romanian First League: 1964.
Under-23 team: 8 matches – 0 goals

International goals

Notes

 The 1966–67 Second League appearances made for ASA Târgu Mureş are unavailable.

Honours
Steaua București
Cupa României: 1966

References

External links

1942 births
2013 deaths
Footballers from Bucharest
Romanian footballers
Romania international footballers
Romanian people of Serbian descent
Liga I players
Liga II players
CSM Jiul Petroșani players
Faur București players
FC Rapid București players
FC Olimpia Satu Mare players
FC Steaua București players
FC Argeș Pitești players
FC Petrolul Ploiești players
FC Progresul București players
FC Brașov (1936) players
FC Drobeta-Turnu Severin players
FCM Târgoviște players
ASA Târgu Mureș (1962) players
Footballers at the 1964 Summer Olympics
Olympic footballers of Romania
Association football forwards